Puran Giri (born 22 April 1986) is an Indian cricketer. He made his first-class debut on 11 January 2020, for Sikkim in the 2019–20 Ranji Trophy.

References

External links
 

1986 births
Living people
Indian cricketers
Sikkim cricketers
Place of birth missing (living people)